Lebring-Sankt Margarethen is a municipality in the district of Leibnitz in the Austrian state of Styria.

Geography
Lebring lies on the right bank of the Mur river about 4 km south of Wildon and 8 km north of Leibnitz.

References

Cities and towns in Leibnitz District